The Christavia Mk IV (Christ-in-Aviation) is a Canadian homebuilt aircraft that was designed by Ron Mason and produced by Elmwood Aviation of Frankford, Ontario (formerly in Belleville, Ontario). The aircraft is supplied in the form of plans for amateur construction.

Design and development
Designed for African missionary work the Mark IV is a development of the Christavia Mk I, with greater wingspan, a longer fuselage and two additional seats. The aircraft features a strut-braced high-wing, a four-seat enclosed cabin with doors, fixed conventional landing gear and a single engine in tractor configuration.

The aircraft fuselage is made from welded 4130 steel tubing, while the wing is of all-wooden construction, with all surfaces covered with doped aircraft fabric. Later models have an aluminum wing spar. The wing is supported by "V" struts with jury struts. The standard engine used is the  Lycoming O-320 powerplant.

Plans are marketed by Aircraft Spruce & Specialty Co. Ron Mason sold the rights to the Christavia series of aircraft to Aircraft Spruce and no longer supplies the plans or support. The designer estimates the construction time from the supplied plans as 2600 hours.

Operational history
By 1998 the designer reported that 250 examples were flying.

In December 2016 five examples were registered in the United States with the Federal Aviation Administration and eight with Transport Canada.

Specifications (Christavia Mk IV)

References

External links

Christavia Mk IV
1980s Canadian civil utility aircraft
Single-engined tractor aircraft
High-wing aircraft
Homebuilt aircraft